Alexander Grau (born February 17, 1973) is a German racing driver. He has competed in such series as Deutsche Tourenwagen Meisterschaft and the German Formula Three Championship.

References

External links
 Career statistics from Driver Database

1973 births
Living people
Sportspeople from Augsburg
German racing drivers
Deutsche Tourenwagen Masters drivers
24 Hours of Le Mans drivers
FIA GT Championship drivers
Racing drivers from Bavaria

Mercedes-AMG Motorsport drivers